William Goss may refer to:

William Henry Goss, English potter
William Freeman Myrick Goss, American mechanical engineer and inventor
Roland Drew, né William Goss, actor

See also
Bill Goss (disambiguation)
William Gosse (disambiguation)